The Remains of Nothing is a 2004 Italian historical drama film directed by Antonietta De Lillo.

It was screened out of competition at the 61st Venice International Film Festival. It won the David di Donatello Award for Best Costume Design (to Daniela Ciancio).

Cast   
Maria de Medeiros as Eleonora
 Imma Villa as Graziella
 Rosario Sparno as Gennaro
 Raffaele Di Florio as  Vincenzo Sanges
 Riccardo Zinna as Pasquale Tria
 Maria Grazia Grassini as  Donna Vovò Fonseca
Enzo Moscato as Gaetano Filangieri 
Cesare Belsito as  King Ferdinand
 Giulia Weber as   Maria Carolina
 Nunzia Di Somma as  Luisa Sanfelice
 Ivan Polidoro as Vincenzo Cuoco
 Raffaele Esposito as Domenico Cirillo 
 Emi Salvador as Ciro Pulcinella

See also 
 List of Italian films of 2004

References

External links

2000s historical drama films
Films set in the 18th century
Italian historical drama films
2004 drama films
2004 films
Cultural depictions of Italian women
2000s Italian films